Saint Louis encephalitis is a disease caused by the mosquito-borne Saint Louis encephalitis virus.  Saint Louis encephalitis virus is related to Japanese encephalitis virus and is a member of the family Flaviviridae. This disease mainly affects the United States, including Hawaii. Occasional cases have been reported from Canada, Mexico and the Caribbean, including the Greater Antilles, Trinidad and Tobago, and Jamaica.

Signs and symptoms
The majority of infections result in mild illness, including fever and headache. When infection is more severe the person may experience headache, high fever, neck stiffness, stupor, disorientation, coma, tremors, occasional convulsions and spastic paralysis. Elderly people are more likely to have a fatal infection.

Transmission
Mosquitoes, primarily from the genus Culex, become infected by feeding on birds infected with the Saint Louis encephalitis virus. The most common vector of this disease within the genus Culex is Culex pipiens, also known as the common house mosquito. Infected mosquitoes then transmit the Saint Louis encephalitis virus to humans and animals during the feeding process. The Saint Louis encephalitis virus grows both in the infected mosquito and the infected bird, but does not make either one sick. Only infected mosquitoes can transmit Saint Louis encephalitis virus. Once a human has been infected with the virus it is not transmissible from that individual to other humans.

Genetics
Five evolutionary genetic studies of SLE virus have been published of which four focused on phylogeny, genetic variation, and recombination dynamics by sequencing the envelope protein gene and parts of other genes.

A recent evolutionary study based on 23 new full open reading frame sequences (near-complete genomes) found that the North American strains belonged to a single clade. Strains were isolated at different points in time (from 1933 to 2001) which allowed for the estimation of divergence times of SLE virus clades and the overall evolutionary rate. Furthermore, this study found an increase in the effective population size of the SLE virus around the end of the 19th century that corresponds to the split of the latest North American clade, suggesting a northwards colonization of SLE virus in the Americas, and a split from the ancestral South American strains around 1892. Scans for natural selection showed that most codons of the SLE virus ORF were evolving neutrally or under negative selection. Positive selection was statistically detected only at one single codon coding for amino acids belonging to the hypothesized N-linked glycosylation site of the envelope protein. Nevertheless, the latter can be due to selection in vitro (laboratory) rather than in vivo (host). In an independent study 14 out of 106 examined envelope gene sequences were found not to contain a specific codon at position 156 coding for this glycosylation site (Ser→Phe/Tyr).

Another study estimated the evolutionary rate to be  (95% confidence ). The virus seems to have evolved in northern Mexico and then spread northwards with migrating birds.

Treatment
There are no vaccines or any other treatments specifically for Saint Louis encephalitis virus, although one study showed that early use of interferon alfa-2b may decrease the severity of complications.

Epidemiology

In the United States an average of 128 cases of Saint Louis encephalitis are recorded annually. In temperate areas of the United States, Saint Louis encephalitis cases occur primarily in the late summer or early fall. In the southern United States where the climate is milder Saint Louis encephalitis can occur year-round.

History
The name of the virus goes back to 1933 when within five weeks in autumn an encephalitis epidemic of explosive proportions broke out in the vicinity of St. Louis, Missouri, and the neighboring St. Louis County.
Over 1,000 cases were reported to the local health departments and the newly constituted National Institutes of Health of the United States was appealed to for epidemiological and investigative expertise.
The previously unknown virus that caused the epidemic was isolated by the NIH team first in monkeys and then in white mice.

References

External links 

 United States Centers for Disease Control and Prevention. Saint Louis encephalitis.
 
 The Encephalitis Society - A Global resource on Encephalitis
 

Viral encephalitis
Insect-borne diseases